Ingo Althöfer (born 1961) is a German mathematician at the University of Jena, where he holds the chair of operations research.

Althöfer earned his PhD in 1986 at Bielefeld University. His dissertation, Asymptotic Properties of Certain Competition Systems in Artificial Intelligence and Ecology, was supervised by Rudolf Ahlswede.

Contributions
Topics in Althöfer's professional research include the realization of finite metric spaces by shortest path metrics in graphs and their approximation by greedy spanners, algorithmic game theory and combinatorial game theory, and heuristic search algorithms for optimization problems.

Althöfer is also known for his inventions of games and puzzles, including dice game EinStein würfelt nicht!, for his experiments with self-assembly of Lego building blocks by running them through a washing machine, and for his innovations in computer-human chess playing. In the 1990s he tested his "drei hirn" ["3-brains"] system, in which a human decides between the choices of two computer chess players, against strong human players including grandmaster David Bronstein and woman grandmaster Sofia Polgar. In 2004 he and Timo Klaustermeyer introduced freestyle chess, a style of human chess playing allowing arbitrary consultation with computers or other people.

Books
 
 

He has also self-published other books through his personal publishing company, 3-Hirn Verlag, and is one of the editors of the multi-volume book series Rudolf Ahlswede’s Lectures on Information Theory.

Selected Papers

Selected Board Games
 EinStein würfelt nicht! (2005)
 Galtoni (2012), a mixture of Connect Four and the Galton board
 San Jego (2015), a variant of Clobber

References

External links

Home page
3-Hirn Verlag, Althöfer's book publishing company

1961 births
Living people
20th-century German mathematicians
Operations researchers
Bielefeld University alumni
Academic staff of the University of Jena
21st-century German mathematicians